Kavumu Airport  is an airport serving Bukavu, the capital city of the Sud-Kivu (South Kivu) province in the Democratic Republic of the Congo.

The Bukavu non-directional beacon (Ident: BKV) is located on the field.

Airlines and destinations

Accidents and incidents 
 On 1 September 2008 a Beechcraft 1900C-1 registered as ZS-OLD operated by CEM Air for the charity Air Serv International was 15 km out on approach to Bukavu when it flew into a steep ridge on Mount Kahuzi at 10,000 ft near Bukavu-Kavum. All 15 passengers and 2 crew aboard were killed.
 On 14 February 2011 a LET L-410 registered 9Q-CIF of African Air Services Commuter flying a cargo flight on behalf of the World Food Programme from Kavumu to Lusenge (near Kava) crashed shortly after departure from Kavumu.  The aircraft impacted Mont Bienga, killing both the Ukrainian pilot and Congolese co-pilot, and destroying the aircraft.
 On 12 February 2012, a Gulfstream IV business jet carrying then-finance minister (and future prime minister) of the DRC, Matata Ponyo Mapon, crashed while landing at Kavumu airport. The crash killed both pilots and two passengers as well as two farmers on the ground, while two passengers including Ponyo survived with injuries.

See also
Transport in Democratic Republic of the Congo
List of airports in Democratic Republic of the Congo

References

External links
OpenStreetMap - Kavumu Airport

FallingRain - Kavumu Airport

Airports in South Kivu
Buildings and structures in Bukavu